The 1978 Masters Tournament was the 42nd Masters Tournament, held April 6–9 at Augusta National Golf Club in Augusta, Georgia. Gary Player overcame a 7-shot deficit going into the final round to win his third Masters and ninth major championship. Player, age 42, shot a record-tying 64 (−8) in the final round to win by one stroke. The runners-up were Rod Funseth, defending champion Tom Watson, and 54-hole leader Hubert Green, the reigning U.S. Open champion, who shot an even-par 72.

Tied for tenth place at the start of the round, Player shot a 30 on the back nine in the summer-like heat. The leader in the clubhouse, Player had to wait forty minutes for the final groups to finish. Funseth had five birdies, but his two bogeys were both three-putts and he parred the last three holes. Watson eagled 13 and birdied both 15 and 16, but missed an  putt for par on the final hole. After a bogey at 16, Green hit an outstanding approach shot at 18 which left a birdie putt from three feet (0.9 m) to tie, but he missed after being inadvertently distracted by a radio announcer.

Player became the oldest winner of the Masters and the first over forty in nearly a quarter century; Sam Snead won his third green jacket at age 41 in 1954.  Player retained the honor for eight years, until Jack Nicklaus won his sixth at 46 in 1986.

Field
1. Masters champions
Tommy Aaron, George Archer (8), Gay Brewer, Billy Casper (8), Charles Coody (10), Raymond Floyd (8,11,12), Doug Ford, Bob Goalby, Jack Nicklaus (4,8,9,10,11,12), Arnold Palmer (8), Gary Player (3,8,9), Sam Snead, Art Wall Jr., Tom Watson (3,8,9,10,11,12)

Jack Burke Jr., Jimmy Demaret, Ralph Guldahl, Claude Harmon, Ben Hogan, Herman Keiser, Cary Middlecoff, Byron Nelson, Henry Picard, and Gene Sarazen did not play.

The following categories only apply to Americans

2. U.S. Open champions (last five years)
Lou Graham (8,9,10,12), Hubert Green (8,9,11,12), Hale Irwin (8,11,12), Johnny Miller (3), Jerry Pate (8,10,11)

3. The Open champions (last five years)
Tom Weiskopf (8,9,11)

4. PGA champions (last five years)
Dave Stockton (12), Lee Trevino (11), Lanny Wadkins (10,11,12)

5. 1977 U.S. Amateur semi-finalists
Doug Fischesser (a), Ralph Landrum (a), Jay Sigel (7,a)

John Fought (6,7) forfeited his exemption by turning professional.

6. Previous two U.S. Amateur and Amateur champions
Dick Siderowf (7,a)

Bill Sander (7) forfeited his exemption by turning professional.

7. Members of the 1977 U.S. Walker Cup team
Mike Brannan (a), Gary Hallberg (a), Vance Heafner (a), Lindy Miller (a), Fred Ridley (a)

Scott Simpson forfeited his exemption by turning professional.

8. Top 24 players and ties from the 1977 Masters Tournament
Andy Bean, Jim Colbert, Ben Crenshaw (11), Danny Edwards, Lee Elder, Rod Funseth (9), Don January (10,12), Tom Kite, Billy Kratzert (11), Gene Littler (10,11), Rik Massengale, Andy North (11), John Schlee, Bob Wynn

9. Top 16 players and ties from the 1977 U.S. Open
Wally Armstrong, Terry Diehl, Al Geiberger (10,11), Jay Haas (11), Joe Inman, Gary Jacobson, Lyn Lott, Mike McCullough, Steve Melnyk, Tom Purtzer

10. Top eight players and ties from 1977 PGA Championship
Jerry McGee (11,12)

11. Winners of PGA Tour events since the previous Masters
Miller Barber, Dave Eichelberger, Mike Hill, Mac McLendon, Gil Morgan, Mike Morley, Bill Rogers, Jim Simons, Ed Sneed (12), Leonard Thompson

12. Members of the U.S. 1977 Ryder Cup team
Dave Hill

13. Foreign invitations
Isao Aoki, Seve Ballesteros (11), Bobby Cole (11), Antonio Garrido, David Graham (8), Peter McEvoy (6,a), Tsuneyuki Nakajima, Peter Oosterhuis (9), Masashi Ozaki, Manuel Piñero

Numbers in brackets indicate categories that the player would have qualified under had they been American.

Round summaries

First round
Thursday, April 6, 1978

Source:

Second round
Friday, April 7, 1978

Source:

Third round
Saturday, April 8, 1978

Source:

Final round
Sunday, April 9, 1978

Final leaderboard

Sources:

Scorecard

Cumulative tournament scores, relative to par
{|class="wikitable" span = 50 style="font-size:85%;
|-
|style="background: Red;" width=10|
|Eagle
|style="background: Pink;" width=10|
|Birdie
|style="background: PaleGreen;" width=10|
|Bogey
|}
Source:

References

External links
Masters.com – past winners
Augusta.com – 1978 Masters leaderboard and scorecards

1978
1978 in golf
1978 in American sports
1978 in sports in Georgia (U.S. state)
April 1978 sports events in the United States